The 11th Kansas Volunteer Cavalry Regiment was a cavalry regiment that served in the Union Army during the American Civil War.

Service
The 11th Kansas Cavalry was organized at Kansas City, Kansas in late April 1863 from the 11th Kansas Infantry, which ceased to exist. It mustered in for three years under the command of Colonel Thomas Ewing Jr.

The regiment was attached to District of the Border and District of Kansas, Department of the Missouri, until February 1865. District of Upper Arkansas to March 1865. 2nd Brigade, 2nd Division, VII Corps, Department of Arkansas, to April 1865. District of the Plains, Department of Missouri, to September 1865.

The 11th Kansas Cavalry mustered out of service at Fort Leavenworth on July 17, 1865.

Detailed service 
Assigned to duty on eastern border of Kansas until October 1864. Expedition from Salem to Mulberry Creek, Kansas, August 8–11, 1863 (detachment). Scout on Republican River, Kansas, August 19–24, 1863 (detachment). Operations against Quantrill on his raid into Kansas August 20–28. Independence, Missouri, August 25. (Companies C and F duty on southern border of Kansas December 1863 to August 1864.) Company L stationed at Fort Riley; Company G at Fort Leavenworth as body guard to General Samuel Curtis. Action at Scott's Ford, Missouri, October 14, 1863. Deep Water Creek, Missouri, October 15. Expedition into Missouri June 16–20, 1864. Scout from Salem to Mulberry Creek August 8–11 (detachment). Operations against Indians in Nebraska August 11-November 28 (1 company). Operations against Price in Missouri and Kansas. Lexington October 19. Little Blue October 21. Independence, Big Blue, and State Line October 22. Westport October 23. Cold Water Grove October 24. Mine Creek, Little Osage River, October 25. Regiment ordered to Fort Riley December 1864. Companies C and E to Fort Larned February 1865. Regiment moved to Fort Kearney, Nebraska, February 20-March 4, then moved to Fort Laramie March 6-April 9, and to Platte Bridge. Duty guarding telegraph lines and operating against Indians until June. Sage Creek, Dakota Territory, April 21. Deer Creek May 21. Platte Bridge, Dakota Territory, June 3. Companies A, B, E, F, L, and M moved to Fort Halleck June 11–24. Protect stage route from Camp Collins, Colorado, to Green River until August 13. White River, Dakota Territory, June 17. Rock Creek July 1. Fort Halleck July 4 and 26. Moved to Fort Leavenworth.

Casualties
The regiment lost a total of 173 men during service; 61 enlisted men killed or mortally wounded, 2 officers and 110 enlisted men died of disease.

Commanders
 Colonel Thomas Ewing Jr.
 Colonel Thomas Moonlight

Notable members
 Captain Grenville Lew Gove, Company G - died of disease November 7, 1864; Gove County, Kansas is named in his honor
 Lieutenant Colonel Preston B. Plumb - U.S. Senator from Kansas (1877–1891)
 Private John C. Rooks, Company I - killed at the battle of Prairie Grove; Rooks County, Kansas is named in his honor
 Major Edmund G. Ross - printer and newspaperman, later a Republican U.S. Senator from Kansas who is most noted for his "no" vote against the 1868 impeachment of Andrew Johnson.

See also

 11th Regiment Kansas Volunteer Infantry
 List of Kansas Civil War Units
 Kansas in the Civil War

Notes

References
Attribution

External links
 History of the 11th Kansas Cavalry by the Museum of the Kansas National Guard
 Guidon of Company A, 11th Kansas Cavalry at the Kansas State Historical Society

Military units and formations established in 1862
Military units and formations disestablished in 1865
Units and formations of the Union Army from Kansas
1862 establishments in Kansas